This is a list of lighthouses in Cuba.

Lighthouses

See also
 Lists of lighthouses and lightvessels

References

External links

 

 
Cuba
Lighthouses
Lighthouses